The Thor-Burner was an American expendable launch system, a member of the Thor rocket family. It consisted of a Thor missile, with one or two Burner upper stages. It was used between 1965 and 1976 to orbit a number of satellites, most commonly Defense Meteorological Satellite Program weather satellites. Twenty-four were launched, of which two failed. It weighed 51,810 kg  and was 24 metres tall.

Burner 1 and Altair 
The Burner 1 stage was an Altair rocket stage as used for the third stage of some Vanguard launch vehicles, but equipped by Boeing with 3-axis control.

This combination was used for six vehicles. The first was launched 1965-01-18 and the sixth 1966-03-30. These were early launches of classified Defense Meteorological Satellite Program satellites. One of these launches failed.

On February 19, 1976, the attempted launch of a DMSP satellite from Vandenberg's SLC-10W went awry when SECO occurred 5 seconds early. Although the second stage separated and fired properly, the satellite was left in an unusable orbit from which it decayed only one hour after launch. Investigation into the mishap found that the Thor had been loaded an insufficient amount of RJ-1 (a higher grade of kerosene fuel that offered enhanced performance over standard RP-1) for the mission. The amount of LOX on Thor boosters was always the same on every launch, but the amount of kerosene could vary depending on the engine, as different LR-79 engines had slightly different performance levels, and so factory acceptance data was used to determine the fuel load needed for a particular unit. The particular engine used in Thor 182 had thus been loaded with kerosene according to the data sheet provided by Rocketdyne, however the information contained a typo which led to ground crews loading too little propellant for it. However, the postflight investigation also found that, even if the correct propellant load had been carried, the mission would have still failed because the Thor did not have sufficient performance to loft the DMSP into the required orbit. As the DMSP program evolved, the satellites gradually became heavier and more complex. Program planners, aware of this, selected an LR-79 engine which had particularly high performance, but it still turned out to not be enough for the mission. The failure was thus ultimately attributed to poor mission planning.

Burner 2 
The Burner 2 used with the Thor-Burner was the first solid fuel upper-stage vehicle used for general space applications that had full control and guidance capability. The first Burner II flight was on 1966-09-15.

References 

Thor (rocket family)